Tomi Jaakko Poikolainen (born 27 December 1961) is a retired Finnish archer who competed in five consecutive Olympics from 1980 to 1996. He won an individual gold medal in 1980 and a team silver in 1992, placing fifth individually in 1984. Between 1978 and 1994 Poikolainen won 11 medals at European and world championships, including two European gold medals. His wife Jutta Poikolainen is also a retired Olympic archer.

References

1961 births
Living people
Sportspeople from Helsinki
Finnish male archers
Archers at the 1980 Summer Olympics
Archers at the 1984 Summer Olympics
Archers at the 1988 Summer Olympics
Archers at the 1992 Summer Olympics
Archers at the 1996 Summer Olympics
Olympic archers of Finland
Olympic gold medalists for Finland
Olympic silver medalists for Finland
Olympic medalists in archery
Medalists at the 1992 Summer Olympics
Medalists at the 1980 Summer Olympics
World Archery Championships medalists